The Better 'Ole is a 1926 American silent World War I comedy drama film. Released by Warner Bros. Pictures, Inc., this film is the second full-length film to utilize the Vitaphone sound-on-disc process, two months after the first Vitaphone feature Don Juan; with no audible dialogue, the film does have a synchronized musical score and sound effects. This film was also the second onscreen adaptation of the 1917 musical The Better 'Ole by Bruce Bairnsfather and Arthur Elliot. Charlie Chaplin's eldest brother Sydney Chaplin played the main lead as Old Bill in perhaps his best-known film today. This film is also believed by many to have the first spoken word of dialog, "coffee", although there are those who disagree. At one point during the film, Harold Goodwin's character  whispers a word to Sydney Chaplin which is also faintly heard.

Plot
Old Bill (Sydney Chaplin), a jovial Limey sergeant, discovers that the major of his regiment is a German spy in collusion with Gaspard (Theodore Lorch), the local innkeeper. The spies mistrust him and poison his wine; but it spills and eats a hole in the floor through which Gaspard falls into the cellar. Trying to rescue him, Bill discovers a cote of carrier pigeons. Tipped off by the major, the Germans bomb an opera house where Bill and fellow soldier Alf (Jack Ackroyd) are performing; they escape, however, in their impersonation of a horse and later pose as German soldiers in a German regiment. Bill manages to get a photograph of the major greeting the German general, but it falls into the hands of Joan (Doris Hill), a prisoner of war. Bill is forced to join a German attack against the British, and though he saves his own regiment, he is shot as a German spy. An old friend, however, has substituted blank cartridges for the real ones, and Bill is pardoned when Joan and his friend Bert arrive with the incriminating photograph.

Cast
 Sydney Chaplin as Pvt. William 'Old Bill' Busby
 Doris Hill as Joan
 Harold Goodwin as Bert Chester - Secret Service
 Jack Ackroyd as Alfie "Little Alf"
 Edgar Kennedy as Cpl. Austin
 Theodore Lorch as Gaspard
 Charles Gerrar as Maj. Russett
 Tom McGuire as The English General
 Tom Kennedy as The Blacksmith
 Kewpie Morgan as Gen. von Hinden
 Arthur Clayton as The Colonel

Premiere Vitaphone short subjects
The Better 'Ole premiered at the Colony Theatre in New York City, New York on October 7, 1926.

Box office
According to Warner Bros records the film earned $955,000 domestically and $318,000 foreign.

Preservation status
The film, as well at its Vitaphone soundtrack, survive and remain intact, with the exception of one reel, which is currently missing.  The film exists in the UCLA Film and Television Archive film archive.

Home media
This film was released on DVD-R through the Warner Archive Collection in 2009.

See also
 List of early Warner Bros. sound and talking features

References

External links
  magazine spread advertisement
 New York Times feature
 
 
 
 

1926 films
1920s war comedy-drama films
American black-and-white films
American silent feature films
American war comedy-drama films
Films based on British comics
Films based on musicals
Military humor in film
Transitional sound comedy-drama films
Warner Bros. films
Western Front (World War I) films
Early sound films
1920s American films
Silent war films
Silent American comedy-drama films
1920s English-language films